Doggerland was an area of land, now submerged beneath the North Sea, that connected Britain to continental Europe. It was flooded by rising sea levels around 6500–6200 BCE. The flooded land is known as the Dogger Littoral. Geological surveys have suggested that it stretched from what is now the east coast of Great Britain to what are now the Netherlands, the western coast of Germany and the Danish peninsula of Jutland. It was probably a rich habitat with human habitation in the Mesolithic period, although rising sea levels gradually reduced it to low-lying islands before its final submergence, possibly following a tsunami caused by the Storegga Slide. Doggerland was named after the Dogger Bank, which in turn was named after 17th-century Dutch fishing boats called doggers.

The archaeological potential of the area was first identified in the early 20th century, and interest intensified in 1931 when a fishing trawler operating east of the Wash dragged up a barbed antler point that was subsequently dated to a time when the area was tundra. Vessels have since dragged up remains of mammoths, lions and other animals, and a few prehistoric tools and weapons.

 international teams are continuing a two-year investigation into the submerged landscape of Doggerland using new and traditional archaeo-geophysical techniques, computer simulation, and molecular biology. Evidence gathered allows study of past environments, ecological change, and human transition from hunter-gatherer to farming communities.

Formation

Until the middle Pleistocene, Great Britain was a peninsula of Europe, connected by the massive chalk Weald–Artois Anticline across the Strait of Dover. During the Anglian glaciation, about 450,000 years ago, an ice sheet filled much of the North Sea, with a large proglacial lake in the southern part fed by the Rhine, the Scheldt and the Thames. The catastrophic overflow of this lake carved a channel through the anticline, leading to the formation of the Channel River, which carried the combined waters of the Rhine, the Scheldt and the Thames to the Atlantic. This probably created the potential for Great Britain to become isolated from the continent during periods of high sea level, although some scientists argue that the final break did not occur until a second ice-dammed lake overflowed during the MIS8 or MIS6 glaciations, around 340,000 or 240,000 years ago.

During the most recent glaciation of the Last Glacial Maximum, which ended around 18,000 years ago, the North Sea and much of the British Isles were covered with glacial ice, and the sea level was about  lower. The climate later became warmer, and during the Last Glacial Maximum, around 12,000 BCE, Great Britain, as well as much of the North Sea and the English Channel, was an expanse of low-lying tundra.

Evidence, including the contours of the present seabed, indicates that after the first main Ice Age the watershed between the North Sea and the English Channel extended east from East Anglia, then southeast to the Hook of Holland, rather than across the Strait of Dover. The Seine, the Thames, the Meuse, the Scheldt and the Rhine joined and flowed west along the English Channel as a wide slow river before eventually reaching the Atlantic Ocean. In about 10,000 BCE the north-facing coastal area of Doggerland had a coastline of lagoons, saltmarshes, mudflats and beaches as well as inland streams, rivers, marshes and lakes. It may have been the richest hunting, fowling and fishing ground in Europe in the Mesolithic period.

One large river system found by a 3D seismic survey, undertaken by the Birmingham "North Sea Palaeolandscapes Project", drained the southeastern part of the Dogger Bank hill area into the east end of the Outer Silver Pit lake. It has been named the Shotton River after the Birmingham geologist Frederick William Shotton.

Disappearance

As ice melted at the end of the last glacial period of the current ice age, sea levels rose and the land began to tilt in an isostatic adjustment as the huge weight of ice lessened. Doggerland eventually became submerged, cutting off what was previously the British peninsula from the European mainland by around 6500 BCE. The Dogger Bank, an upland area of Doggerland, remained an island until at least 5000 BCE. Key stages are now believed to have included the gradual evolution of a large tidal bay between eastern England and Dogger Bank by 9000 BCE and a rapid sea level rise thereafter, leading to Dogger Bank becoming an island and Britain becoming physically disconnected from the continent.

A recent hypothesis suggests that around 6200 BCE much of the remaining coastal land was flooded by a tsunami caused by a submarine landslide off the coast of Norway known as the Storegga Slide. This suggests "that the Storegga Slide tsunami would have had a catastrophic impact on the contemporary coastal Mesolithic population ... Britain finally became separated from the continent and in cultural terms, the Mesolithic there goes its own way." A study published in 2014 suggested that the only remaining parts of Doggerland at the time of the Storegga Slide were low-lying islands, but supported the view that the area had been abandoned at about the same time as the tsunamis.

Another view speculates that the Storegga tsunami devastated Doggerland, but then ebbed back into the sea, and that later Lake Agassiz (in North America) burst, releasing so much fresh water that sea levels rose over about two years to flood much of Doggerland and make Great Britain an island. The difference in distribution of broken shells between lower-lying and high-lying parts of the area also suggest survival of land after the Storegga tsunami.

Discovery and investigation by archaeologists

The existence of what is now known as Doggerland was established in the late 19th century. H. G. Wells referred to the concept in "A Story of the Stone Age" (1897), which is set in "a time when one might have walked dryshod from France (as we call it now) to England, and when a broad and sluggish Thames flowed through its marshes to meet its father Rhine, flowing through a wide and level country that is underwater in these latter days, and which we know by the name of the North Sea. ... Fifty thousand years ago it was, fifty thousand years if the reckoning of geologists is correct", though most of the action seems to occur in what is now Surrey and Kent, but stretching out to Doggerland.

The remains of plants brought to the surface from Dogger Bank were studied in 1913 by Clement Reid, and the remains of animals and worked flints from the Neolithic period had also been found. In his book The Antiquity of Man of 1915, anatomist Sir Arthur Keith discussed the archaeological potential of the area.

Interest was reinvigorated in the 1990s by Bryony Coles, who named the area "Doggerland" "after the great banks in the southern North Sea" – and produced speculative maps of the area. Although she recognised that the current relief of the southern North Sea seabed is not a sound guide to the topography of Doggerland, this topography has more recently begun to be reconstructed more authoritatively using seismic survey data obtained from oil exploration. The results of this study were published as a technical monograph and a popular book on the history and archaeology of Doggerland. Names have been given to some of its features: "The Spines" to a system of dunes above the broad "Shotton River", the upland area of the "Dogger Bank", a basin between two huge sandbanks called "The Outer Silver Pit". 

In March 2010, it was reported that recognition of the potential archaeological importance of the area could affect the future development of offshore wind farms. In 2019, a flint flake partially covered in birch bark tar dredged up off the coast of the Netherlands provided valuable insight into Neanderthal technology and cognitive evolution.

In 2012 the results of study of Doggerland by the universities of Birmingham, St Andrews, Dundee, and Aberdeen, including surveys of artefacts, were displayed at the Royal Society summer exhibition in London. Richard Bates of St Andrews University said:

Since 2015 the University of Bradford's Europe's Lost Frontiers project has continued mapping the prehistoric landscapes of Doggerland and has used this data to direct a programme of extensive coring of marine palaeochannels. Sediment from the cores has provided sedimentary DNA as well as conventional environmental data and these will be used in a major computational modelling programme replicating colonisation of the submerged landscape.

In media
 The area was featured in a 2007 episode of the Channel 4 Time Team documentary series called "Britain's Drowned World". It was followed up in 2017 by "Britain's Stone Age Tsunami", investigating the Storegga Slide's effect on the land.

See also
 List of lost lands
 Maglemosian culture
 Norwegian Trench
 Outburst flood
 Paleoshoreline
 Submerged continent
 Weald–Artois Anticline

Explanatory notes

References

Further reading
 
 
 

  Discussed in depth in chapters 2–4.

External links

"Hunting for DNA in Doggerland, an Ancient Land Beneath the North Sea", Elizabeth Preston, Wired, 27 November 2015
"The moment Britain became an island", Megan Lane, BBC News, 15 February 2011
"North Sea Paleolandscapes", Institute for Archaeology and Antiquity, University of Birmingham
Britain's 'Atlantis’ found
"North Sea Prehistory Research and Management Framework (NSPRMF) 2009", English Heritage, 2009
"The Doggerland project", Professor Bryony Coles, University of Exeter. Includes hypothesised map of Doggerland in the early Holocene.
CGI images (2 stills and a movie) of a Mesolithic camp beside the Shotton River
"Das rekonstruierte Doggerland" ("Doggerland reconstructed"), computer generated images of a Doggerland landscape, 19 August 2008, Der Spiegel  
"Hidden Doggerland underworld uncovered in North Sea", BBC News, 3 July 2012
Europe's Lost Frontiers
2013 European Heritage Prize awarded to M. Daniel Thérond and Professor Vincent Gaffney#
Mapping Doggerland: the Mesolithic Landscapes of the southern North Sea
 Feb 13, 2020 Science (journal)
Evidence of settlements on Doggerland

E
Historical geology
History of the North Sea
Ice ages
Continental shelves of Europe
Geology of the North Sea
Stone Age Europe
Quaternary Europe
Landforms of the North Sea